HŠK Concordia was a Croatian football club formed in Zagreb. The club was founded as
the Srednjoškolski športski klub in 1906.

By the end of the First World War the club had played many matches with both domestic and foreign clubs. After the war, the prewar members along with the members of HŠK Viktorija re-formed the club as Concordia-Viktorija (quickly renamed Concordia).

One of the most importants acts by the club was the building of a stadium on Tratinska cesta (today's Stadion u Kranjčevićevoj), then the biggest in Zagreb. It was finished in 1921. The Yugoslavia national football team played eleven matches at the club's grounds.

Apart from football, the club also competed in athletics, skiing, field hockey and table tennis. The club's most famous footballers were: Pavelić, Babić, Ivan Belošević, Jazbec, Monsider, Pavletić, Aleksandar Živković, Kodrnja and Karlo Muradori. The club played in both the Yugoslav and Croatian leagues. In 1945 it was renamed Zeleni 1906. NK Zagreb's third jersey is green in honour of Concordia, whose old stadium is now their own.

Accomplishments 
 Kingdom of Yugoslavia Championship
 1930, 1932
 Croatian First League
 1942
 Croatian Cup
 Finalist: 1941

Club presidents 
Ervin Rosmanith (1906–11)
J. Reberski (1912–22)
Roman Rosmanith (1923)
M. Pajnić (1924)
M. Bosnić (1925–32)
L. Thaller (1933–40)

References

 
Football clubs in Zagreb
Association football clubs established in 1906
Association football clubs disestablished in 1945
Defunct football clubs in Croatia
1906 establishments in Croatia
1945 disestablishments in Croatia